Marudapandy Rameshwaran (born 26 December 1976) is a Sri Lankan politician, former provincial minister and Member of Parliament.

Rameshwaran was born on 26 December 1976. He was treasurer and deputy president of the Ceylon Workers' Congress.  He was a member of the Central Provincial Council and held several provincial ministerial portfolios. He was arrested in December 2017 in connection with an assault on a National Union of Workers supporter at a funeral in Maskeliya and later released on bail.

Rameshwaran contested the 2020 parliamentary election as a Sri Lanka People's Freedom Alliance electoral alliance candidate in Nuwara Eliya District and was elected to the Parliament of Sri Lanka.

References

1976 births
Agriculture ministers of Sri Lankan provinces
Ceylon Workers' Congress politicians
Education ministers of Sri Lankan provinces
Indian Tamil politicians of Sri Lanka
Living people
Members of the 16th Parliament of Sri Lanka
Members of the Central Province Board of Ministers
Prisoners and detainees of Sri Lanka
Sri Lankan Hindus
Sri Lankan prisoners and detainees
Sri Lanka People's Freedom Alliance politicians
United People's Freedom Alliance politicians